Digah (also, Digyakh and Dygya) is a village and municipality in the Lankaran Rayon of Azerbaijan.  It has a population of 2,347.

References 

Populated places in Lankaran District